Digrammia delectata is a species of geometrid moth in the family Geometridae.

The MONA or Hodges number for Digrammia delectata is 6374.

References

Further reading

External links

 

Macariini
Articles created by Qbugbot
Moths described in 1887